Alain Delon is a French brand of cigarettes, currently owned and manufactured by Altadis. The brand name refers to the French actor Alain Delon.

History
Alain Delon was launched in 1992 for the Japanese market by SEITA, which became Altadis in 1999 after merging with the Spanish company, Tabacalera. Since the acquisition of this brand by British American Tobacco, the brand is mainly sold by the subsidiary BAT in Cambodia.

The production was interrupted in 2014 before it resumed again in June 2016 with a new presentation.

The brand is popular in Asia, especially in Cambodia, due to the fact that the film Zorro was the first foreign movie to be played in China. Alain Delon cigarettes are sold in Thailand, Myanmar, Laos and Vietnam as well. The brand is, or was also sold in Russia and Hong Kong.

Two slogans have been used for the brand: "A taste of France" was the one used until 2014, while "Signature taste" has been in use since 2016.

See also

 Tobacco smoking

References

1992 establishments in Asia
2014 disestablishments in Asia
2016 establishments in Asia
British American Tobacco brands
Alain Delon